Tanjung Redeb is a town and district which is the administrative centre of Berau Regency, in East Kalimantan Province, Indonesia. It covers an area of 24.42 km2, and at the 2020 Census it had a population of 71,231.

Climate
Tanjung Redeb has a tropical rainforest climate (Af) with moderate rainfall from July to September and heavy rainfall in the remaining months.

References

berau Regency
Districts of East Kalimantan
Regency seats of East Kalimantan